Robert of France ( 1296/1297 – 1308), was the youngest child of King Philip IV of France and Joan I of Navarre. He died young, but was briefly betrothed to Constance of Sicily.

Life 
Born in Paris, Robert was born either in 1296 or 1297. He was the youngest child of Philip IV of France and his wife Joan, the reigning Queen of Navarre. In 1306, at the age of ten, he was betrothed to Constance of Sicily, daughter of Frederick III of Sicily and Eleanor of Anjou. However, Robert died in 1308, and the marriage alliance was abandoned. Constance would later go on to become Queen of Cyprus as the wife of Henry II of Cyprus.

Ancestry

References

Citations

Bibliography 
 
 

1296 births
1308 deaths
House of Capet
Sons of kings
French princes
Royalty and nobility who died as children